These lists of historical unrecognized or partially recognized states or governments give an overview of extinct geopolitical entities that wished to be recognized as sovereign states, but did not enjoy worldwide diplomatic recognition. The entries listed here had de facto control over their claimed territory and were self-governing with a desire for full independence; or if they lacked such control over their territory, they were recognized by at least one other recognized nation.

Criteria for inclusion 
The criteria for inclusion in this list are similar to those of the list of states with limited recognition. To be included here, a polity must have claimed sovereignty, has not had recognition by at least one widely accepted state for a significant portion of its de facto existence, and either:

 had a population and an organized government with a capacity to enter into relations with other states; or
 had de facto control over a territory or a significant portion of the territory of an otherwise-recognized sovereign state

Historic unrecognized or partially recognized states with de facto control over their territory

Africa 
The total number of countries in the African continent varies due to the instability throughout the region. See the List of sovereign states and dependent territories in Africa article for a current list.

Great instability was created by graft under leaders in West Africa.

Many leaders marginalised ethnic groups and fanned ethnic conflicts (some of which had been exacerbated, or even created, by colonial rule) for political gain. In many countries, the military was perceived as being the only group that could effectively maintain order, and it ruled many nations in Africa during the 1970s and early 1980s. During the period from the early 1960s to the late 1980s, Africa had more than 70 coups and 13 presidential assassinations. Border and territorial disputes were also common, with the European-imposed borders of many nations being widely contested through armed conflicts.

A variety of other causes have been blamed for Africa's political instability, including Cold War conflicts between the United States and the Soviet Union, over-reliance on foreign aid, as well as the policies of the International Monetary Fund. When a country became independent for the first time, it would often align itself with one of the two superpowers in order to get support. Many countries in Northern Africa received Soviet military aid, while many in Central and Southern Africa were supported by the United States, France or both. The 1970s saw an escalation, as newly independent Angola and Mozambique aligned themselves with the Soviet Union, and the West and South Africa sought to contain Soviet influence by funding insurgency movements. There was a major famine in Ethiopia, when hundreds of thousands of people starved. Some claimed that Marxist/Soviet policies made the situation worse. The most devastating military conflict in modern independent Africa has been the Second Congo War; this conflict and its aftermath have killed an estimated 5.5 million people. Since 2003 there has been an ongoing conflict in Darfur which has become a humanitarian disaster. Another notable tragic event is the 1994 Rwandan Genocide in which an estimated 800,000 people were murdered. AIDS in post-colonial Africa has also been a prevalent issue.

In the 21st century, however, the number of armed conflicts in Africa has steadily declined. For instance, the civil war in Angola came to an end in 2002 after nearly 30 years. The improved stability and economic reforms have led to a great increase in foreign investment into many African nations, mainly from China, which has spurred quick economic growth in many countries, seemingly ending decades of stagnation and decline. Several African economies were among the world's fastest growing as of 2011 and that growth continues through 2019. A significant part of this growth can also be attributed to the facilitated diffusion of information technologies and specifically the mobile phone.

Antiquity to 19th century

20th and 21st centuries

Americas

16th through 19th centuries

20th century

Asia

Antiquity to 19th century

20th and 21st centuries

Europe

Antiquity to 19th century

20th and 21st centuries

Oceania

19th century

20th century

See also 
 List of former sovereign states
 List of historical separatist movements
 List of micronations

Notes

References 

Historical unrecognized countries, list of

Historical